This list includes flags that either have been in use or are currently used by the United Kingdom, British Overseas Territories and the Crown Dependencies.

The College of Arms is the authority on the flying of flags in England, Wales and Northern Ireland and maintains the only official register of flags for these countries. It was established in 1484 and as part of the Royal Household operates under the authority of the Crown. The Lord Lyon King of Arms, established prior to 1399, holds a similar role within Scotland. A separate private body called the Flag Institute, an educational charity financed by its own membership, also maintains a registry of United Kingdom flags that it styles 'the UK Flag Registry', though this has no official status under UK law.

Flags recognised by planning law
Certain classes of flag enjoy a special status within English planning law and can be flown without needing the planning permission normally required for advertisements. These include any country’s national flag, civil ensign or civil air ensign; the flag of the Commonwealth, the United Nations or any other international organisation of which the United Kingdom is a member; a flag of any island, county, district, borough, burgh, parish, city, town or village within the United Kingdom; the flag of the Black Country, East Anglia, Wessex, any Part of Lincolnshire, any Riding of Yorkshire or any historic county within the United Kingdom; the flag of St David; the flag of St Patrick; the flag of any administrative area within any country outside the United Kingdom; any flag of the British Armed Forces; and the Armed Forces Day flag.

Current national flags
National and subnational flags of the United Kingdom.

United Kingdom

Countries of the United Kingdom

The flags of England and of Scotland are ancient war flags which became by usage the national flags of the Kingdom of England (which included Wales) and of the Kingdom of Scotland respectively and continued in use until the Act of Union 1707. Thereafter, they were as de facto flags of those parts of the United Kingdom. The flag of Wales was formalised in 1959, but has ancient origins; the dragon was used as a battle-flag by countless Welsh rulers, the current flag being a redesign of the flag carried by Henry Tudor. The Flag of Northern Ireland is controversial. The coat of arms of the Government of Northern Ireland, a red cross on a white field, defaced with a Red Hand of Ulster within a six pointed star topped with a crown, became used as a local flag, though the end of the province's Government in 1973 ended its official status. This flag has continued to be the internationally recognisable de facto flag of Northern Ireland through its use by international sporting organisations (for example FIFA, UEFA, and the Commonwealth Games) to represent Northern Ireland, though locally it has the allegiance mainly of the Unionist community. The St Patrick's Saltire is also sometimes used by the UK government in London to represent Northern Ireland when a discrete Northern Ireland flag is required.

Crown Dependencies

Parishes of Guernsey

Parishes of Jersey

British Overseas Territories
In 1999, the maritime flags of the British Overseas Territories were updated at the request of the Ministry of Defence. The white discs were removed from the field of the flags and each respective coat of arms was increased in size for ease of identification. As the MoD only had authority over sea flags, the governments of the Overseas Territories were free to continue using the flags with white discs on land. The Overseas Territories' governments did switch to the updated flags over a staggered period of time, however some old-style flags with white discs may still be seen. Such flags have generally been adopted by Order in Council. Civil (Red Ensign) flags are under the control of the United Kingdom Secretary of State for Transport and are split into two categories: Category 1 is to register ships of unlimited tonnage and type. Category 2 is to register commercial ships and yachts of up to 150 gross registered tons.

Governors' flags
Prior to 1999, all Governors' flags had smaller discs and the outer green garland without the gold ring. Therefore, the dates given do not reflect this minor, consistent change.

Ensigns

Naval Service

Army

Air Force

Combined Forces

Yacht club ensigns

Royal Standards

King Charles III

Standards and banners of the Prince of Wales

Other members of the Royal Family

Others

Government

Church

Diplomatic flags

Islands

Local government areas 
Flags are often used to represent counties, cities and towns. Where these are based on a council's banner of arms they are technically for the use of the council, but they are often used to represent the wider area, including by official bodies such as the Department for Communities and Local Government. Northumberland and Hertfordshire County Councils have "released" their banners of arms for use as county flags. Since 2012 it has been permitted in planning law in England to fly a flag of any British island, county, district, borough, burgh, parish, city, town or village without planning permission as an advertisement.

Counties

Cities, towns and villages

University flags

Miscellaneous

Historical and informal areas
It is explicitly permitted to fly the flag of the Black Country, East Anglia, Wessex, any Part of Lincolnshire, any Riding of Yorkshire or any historic county within the United Kingdom without needing any permission or consent.

Historic kingdoms and regions

Historic counties

Yorkshire ridings

Historical flags

National flags and ensigns

Lord Protector's standard

Royal standards

Royal consorts

Welsh Royal Standards

Battle flags

County flags

See also

List of English flags
List of Cornish flags
List of Northern Irish flags
List of Scottish flags
List of Welsh flags

Notes

References

External links

 
 Union Jack at the Royal Family website
 The Flag Institute
 Where to print Flags?
 World Flag Database
 UK Department of Culture- Ceremonial and Flag Flying
 British Armed forces Grenadiers Colour